The 2010 Porsche Carrera Cup Great Britain was the eighth season of the Porsche Carrera Cup Great Britain series. The series again featured on the same package as the British Touring Car Championship, and as such benefited from live coverage at each round on ITV4 in the United Kingdom.

Reigning champion Tim Bridgman will not be back to defend his title in 2010 as he will be taking part in the Porsche Supercup. 2008 Champion Tim Harvey has announced his intention to return to the series for another year after losing out on the championship in 2009.

Entry list
On 17 March 2010, the championship was officially launched at Silverstone, with the organisers unveiling a capacity entry list of 28 cars.

 All drivers race in Porsche 911 GT3s.

Calendar
On 7 October 2009, the British Touring Car Championship announced the race calendar for the 2010 season for all of the series competing on the TOCA package. Each meeting will take place over a weekend. The Porsche Carrera Cup will feature Saturday races at the second meeting at Rockingham and the season finale at Brands Hatch. All other meetings will see the series race twice on Sunday. All races were held in the United Kingdom.

Standings

Notes:
1. – Tim Harvey was penalised three points at Oulton Park.
2. – Glynn Geddie was penalised three points at Brands Hatch GP, with a further six-point penalty at Oulton Park.
3. – Euan Hankey was penalised two points at Rockingham.
4. – Michael Meadows was penalised two points at Thruxton. A four-point penalty was given at Croft and a six-point penalty was given at Donington.
5. – Tom Bradshaw was penalised two points at Donington.
6. – Archie Hamilton was penalised two points at Thruxton, and Silverstone.
7. – Alex Martin was penalised two points at Snetterton.
8. – Paul Mace was penalised two points at Silverstone.
9. – Richard Denny was penalised two points at Brands Hatch GP.

References

External links
 Porsche Carrera Cup Great Britain

Porsche Carrera Cup GB
Porsche Carrera Cup Great Britain seasons